The United Nations Standard Products and Services Code (UNSPSC) is a taxonomy of products and services for use in eCommerce.  It is a four-level hierarchy coded as an eight-digit number, with an optional fifth level adding two more digits.

The latest release (February 14, 2023) of the code set is 25.0901.

The new UNv240301 release contains 740 changes to the previous UNSPSC version UNv23.0701 which are 721 new items added, 12 existing items edited, 6 existing items moved, and 1 existing item deleted. The new UNv24.0301 release contains 157,116 total items.

The changes include a new Segment 57000000 -Humanitarian Relief Items, Kits, or Accessories, requested by United Nation Global Marketplace (UNGM); additional codes were added to support the United States Department of Agriculture (USDA) in is effort to the Specialty Crops Inspection at the U.S. border. 

The UNSPSC competes with a number of other product and commodity coding schemes, including the European Union's Common Procurement Vocabulary, ECLASS, and GS1's Global Product Classification.

History 
The UNSPSC was organized upon the signature of a Memorandum of Understanding signed on September 29, 1998 by John S. Svendsen, the director of the Inter-agency Procurement Services Office (IAPSO) of the United Nations Development Programme (UNDP) and on November 1, 1998 by Lawrence M. Barth, a Vice President of the Dun & Bradstreet Corporation. The development of the first version was overseen by Peter R. Benson, who was also responsible for the design and development of the code management procedure as a modification of the Delphi statistical forecasting method. The process allowed for the rapid development of consensus without dominance or influence.

The ECCMA, a non-profit membership association, was formed in 1999 to manage and promote the UNSPSC until March 2003, with the release of version 6.0315. The UNDP then appointed GS1 US as code manager in May 2003 and ECCMA develops the ECCMA Open Technical Dictionary (eOTD) and the international standards ISO 22745 and ISO 8000.

Description 
The four primary levels of the code are: Segment, Family, Class and Commodity.

Each level is coded in two decimal digits, with '00' treated specially to give segments, families and classes their own eight-digit codes.

Thus 'Cats' are coded as 10101501, 'Dogs' are coded as 10101502 and 'Cattle' as 10101516.  The class of 'Livestock' is 10101500; the family of 'Live animals' is 10100000, and all in the segment 10000000 of 'Live Plant and Animal Material and Accessories and Supplies'.

Optionally, a further two digits can be added for the business function, such as 'retail' or wholesale.

Governance 
The UNSPSC was jointly developed by the United Nations Development Programme (UNDP) and Dun & Bradstreet in 1998 and is currently managed by GS1 US, which is responsible for overseeing code change requests, revising the codes and issuing regularly scheduled updates to the code, as well as managing special projects and initiatives.

Availability and languages 
The codeset is available in English, French, German, Spanish, Italian, Japanese, Korean, Dutch, Mandarin Chinese, Portuguese, Danish, Norwegian, Swedish, and Hungarian. The latest PDF version of the codeset is available for download at no cost, though a user account is required and can be created (also at no cost). A version in Microsoft Excel format is available to members, who can also request changes and suggest additions to the code.

See also

Notes

External links 
 

Dun & Bradstreet
Product classifications
Identifiers
United Nations Development Programme